Mahayogi Guru Gorakhnath AYUSH University, Gorakhpur, formerly State Ayush University, Uttar Pradesh, is an affiliating State University located in Gorakhpur. It was established through the Uttar Pradesh Act No. 6 of 2020, specializing in Ayurveda, yoga & naturopathy, Unani, Siddha and homoeopathy (AYUSH). It was renamed as Maha Yogi Guru Gorakhnath AYUSH University, Gorakhpur by the Uttar Pradesh Act No. 6 of 2021.

History
After winning 2017 Assembly Election BJP-Led Uttar Pradesh Government established Department of AYUSH in same year. In December 2020, the Uttar Pradesh Chief Minister, Yogi Adityanath, announced the establishment of an 'AYUSH University' in Gorakhpur. President Ram Nath Kovind laid foundation stone of this university in Gorakhpur on 28 August 2021 in presence of Uttar Pradesh Governor Anandiben Patel, Chief Minister Yogi Adityanath and several other local politicians.

Vice-Chancellor
The first Vice-Chancellor was appointed by the Government's Chief Minister, and will serve a term of three years. Successive Vice-Chancellors will be appointed by the Chancellor (Governor of Uttar Pradesh) every three years. Awadhesh Kumar Singh was appointed vice chancellor on 4 January 2022.

Academics
The university become functional in 2022 and affiliated colleges in the state that teach Ayurveda, Unani, homeopathy, yoga and naturopathy.

Location
University is constructed in 52 acres at Pipri and Tarkulha Village Panchayat in Bhathat Block of Gorakhpur District. Earlier Village Malmaliya under Chari Chaura Tehsil was proposed for construction, but after local cultivators files case in High Court, new location was searched.

Infrastructure
University construction is targeted to be completed by March 2023. In first phase Administrative Building, Yoga, Ayurveda and Naturotherapy facilities will be constructed. Before construction completion, administration activities will commenced from Sitapur Eye Hospital premises as well as Vice Chancellor residence.

References

External links
 

Proposed infrastructure in Uttar Pradesh
Ministry of AYUSH
2021 establishments in Uttar Pradesh
Universities and colleges in Uttar Pradesh
Education in Gorakhpur
Unaccredited institutions of higher learning in India